Udhana Taluka, formed in 1992 from part of Choryasi Taluka, is a taluka located in the Surat District in the Indian State of Gujarat.  In 2001 the population was 480,456.
Udhana Taluka is part of the Surat Metropolitan Region.

Geography

Major highways
State Highway 6, Gujarat (Old Surat Mumbai Highway)
State Highway 66, Gujarat (Udhana-Magdalla Highway)
State Highway 168, Gujarat (Sachin-Palsana Highway)

Adjacent Talukas
 Choryasi Taluka (South west)
 Jalalpore Taluka  (South)
 Palsana Taluka (southeast)
 Surat city (north)

Demographics
As of the census of 2001, there were 4,80,445 people residing in the county of which 64% are males and 36% are females. The majority of the population is from Other states of Uttar Pradesh, Maharashtra, Madhya Pradesh, Rajasthan, etc.

Communities

Cities 
Udhana
Sachin, Gujarat

References

External links
Udhana County government website

Populated places established in 1992
Surat district
Talukas of Gujarat